Râul Șes may refer to:

 Șes (Râul Mare), a tributary of the Râul Mare in Caraș-Severin and Hunedoara Counties
 Șes, a tributary of the Bistrița in Maramureș County